David Alan Templeman (born 21 November 1965) is an Australian politician who has been a Labor Party member of the Legislative Assembly of Western Australia since 2001, representing the seat of Mandurah.

He is Leader of the House and Minister for Culture and the Arts, Local Government, and Heritage.

Early life 
Templeman was born in Northam, Western Australia, to Beryl Ann Bates and John Thomas Templeman. He attended Northam Senior High School before going on to the Western Australian College of Advanced Education (now Edith Cowan University) to study teaching. Before entering politics, Templeman worked as a schoolteacher, teaching at primary schools in Three Springs, Warnbro, and Mandurah. He also served on the Mandurah City Council between 1994 and 2001, including as deputy mayor from 1997.

Political career
Templeman first ran for parliament at the 1993 state election, but lost to the sitting Liberal member, Roger Nicholls. He re-contested the seat against Nicholls at the 2001 state election, and was successful. Templeman was re-elected at the 2005 election with an increased majority, and was subsequently made a whip in the government of Geoff Gallop. When Alan Carpenter replaced Gallop as premier in January 2006, he was made Minister for Community Development, Minister for Seniors and Volunteering, and Minister for Youth. In a December 2006 reshuffle, he lost the youth portfolio to Ljiljanna Ravlich, but was instead made Minister for Child Protection (a new title) and Minister for Peel. Another reshuffle occurred in March 2007, after which Templeman's titles became Minister for the Environment, Minister for Climate Change, and Minister for Peel. He remained in the ministry until the Labor government's defeat at the 2008 state election. When the Western Australian Labor Party won government in the 2017 state election, Templeman took on three ministries—Culture and the Arts, Local Government, and Heritage—and was appointed Leader of the House. In this role, he delivered a parody of The Sound of Silence by Simon and Garfunkel.

See also
 Carpenter Ministry

References 

1965 births
Living people
Australian Labor Party members of the Parliament of Western Australia
Australian schoolteachers
Edith Cowan University alumni
Members of the Western Australian Legislative Assembly
People from Northam, Western Australia
Western Australian local councillors
Deputy mayors of places in Australia
21st-century Australian politicians